Lennoxtown railway station served the town of Lennoxtown, Dunbartonshire, Scotland from 1867 to 1951 on the Blane Valley Railway.

History 
The station opened as Lennoxtown Blane Valley on 1 July 1867 as Lennoxtown by the North British Railway. A second platform was going to be added but a loop was laid instead; this was later lifted. There were no goods facilities here as they were at the old station. The station's name was changed to Lennoxtown on 1 October 1881. It closed on 1 October 1951.

References

External links 

Railway stations in Great Britain opened in 1867
Railway stations in Great Britain closed in 1951
Former North British Railway stations
1867 establishments in Scotland
1951 disestablishments in Scotland